Luke Charles Pennell (né Fathers; born 26 January 1996), is an English footballer who plays for Hayes & Yeading United on loan from  side Bedford Town, where he plays as a defender.

Club career
Pennell was born in Milton Keynes, Buckinghamshire and attended the Lord Grey School in the town. He started his career with local side Milton Keynes Dons before playing for the football team at Milton Keynes College, which he attended for three years. During this period he also spent time at AFC Rushden & Diamonds, featuring for the under-18 and under-21 sides, making 15 appearances and scoring once between 2012 and 2013. In March 2014, he joined Southern Football League Premier Division side Banbury United for a one-month spell, making six appearances and scoring twice. At the end of the season he joined Spartan South Midlands Football League side Wolverton Town, appearing for the first and reserve sides throughout the year whilst still playing for the College team.

After leaving Milton Keynes College in the summer of 2015, he signed for Southern League Premier Division side Dunstable Town. His form for the Blues alerted professional clubs and Pennell spent time on trial with Premier League side Norwich City and Football League sides Burnley, Fulham, Peterborough United and Fleetwood Town. He was offered a professional contract by League One side Fleetwood Town, but he turned the move down due to financial and logistical problems. However, none of the trials proved successful and Pennell returned to playing for Dunstable in January 2016.

In March 2016, he signed for League Two side Dagenham & Redbridge on a one-year contract with the option of a further year, after manager John Still learned of his availability following his trial at Norwich. He made his professional debut in April 2016, replacing Justin Hoyte as a substitute in a 3–2 defeat to Leyton Orient as the Daggers were relegated to the National League for the first time in nine years. In May 2019, it was announced that he would be released following the expiration of his contract at the end of the 2018–19 campaign.

On 1 July 2019, he signed for National League South side Maidstone United on a free transfer, re-uniting with former Dagenham boss John Still.

Following spells with Gloucester City and Hemel Hempstead Town, Pennell joined Braintree Town ahead of the 2021–22 campaign. During his time in Essex, he went onto feature 42 times as the club fought off relegation from the National League South. He left Braintree at the end of his contract in June 2022.

On 25 June 2022, newly promoted Southern League Premier Division Central side Bedford Town announced the signing of Pennell. In October 2022, Pennell joined Hayes & Yeading United on a one-month loan deal.

Career statistics

References

External links

1996 births
Living people
Association football defenders
People from Milton Keynes
English footballers
Banbury United F.C. players
Dunstable Town F.C. players
Dagenham & Redbridge F.C. players
Maidstone United F.C. players
Gloucester City A.F.C. players
Hemel Hempstead Town F.C. players
Braintree Town F.C. players
Bedford Town F.C. players
Hayes & Yeading United F.C. players
English Football League players
National League (English football) players
Southern Football League players
Footballers from Buckinghamshire